Oeceoclades, collectively known as the monk orchids, is a genus of flowering plants from the orchid family, Orchidaceae. It is related to Eulophia and like that genus is mostly terrestrial in habit. A few species extend into very arid environments, unusual for an orchid.

The genus contains about 40 known species, most of which are narrow endemics to parts of Madagascar with some widespread across much of sub-Saharan Africa and the islands of the Indian Ocean. One species, O. maculata, has become naturalized in Mexico, South America, Central America, the West Indies and Florida. In Florida and several other places,  O. maculata is considered an invasive weed.

The only consistent morphological character that does not show intermediate forms in either genus and can thus separate Oeceoclades from Eulophia is the presence of two fleshy ridges on the basal part of the labellum (the hypochile). The genus was resurrected by Leslie Andrew Garay and Peter Taylor in 1976 and since then has been affirmed as a monophyletic genus in molecular phylogenetic studies.

Species

Species accepted:

Oeceoclades alismatophylla (Rchb.f.) Garay & P.Taylor
Oeceoclades ambongensis (Schltr.) Garay & P.Taylor
Oeceoclades ambrensis (H.Perrier) Bosser & Morat
Oeceoclades analamerensis (H.Perrier) Garay & P.Taylor
Oeceoclades analavelensis (H.Perrier) Garay & P.Taylor
Oeceoclades angustifolia (Senghas) Garay & P.Taylor
Oeceoclades antsingyensis G.Gerlach
Oeceoclades atrovirens (Lindl.) Garay & P.Taylor
Oeceoclades aurea Loubr.
Oeceoclades beravensis (Rchb.f.) R.Bone & Buerki
Oeceoclades boinensis (Schltr.) Garay & P.Taylor
Oeceoclades calcarata (Schltr.) Garay & P.Taylor
Oeceoclades callmanderi Bosser
Oeceoclades cordylinophylla (Rchb.f.) Garay & P.Taylor
Oeceoclades decaryana (H.Perrier) Garay & P.Taylor
Oeceoclades flavescens Bosser & Morat
Oeceoclades furcata Bosser & Morat
Oeceoclades gracillima (Schltr.) Garay & P.Taylor
Oeceoclades hebdingiana (Guillaumin) Garay & P.Taylor
Oeceoclades humbertii (H.Perrier) Bosser & Morat
Oeceoclades lanceata (H.Perrier) Garay & P.Taylor
Oeceoclades latifolia (Rolfe) Garay & P.Taylor
Oeceoclades lavergneae J.-B.Castillon
Oeceoclades lonchophylla (Rchb.f.) Garay & P.Taylor
Oeceoclades longebracteata Bosser & Morat
Oeceoclades lubbersiana (De Wild. & Laurent) Garay & P.Taylor
Oeceoclades maculata (Lindl.) Lindl
Oeceoclades pandurata (Rolfe) Garay & P.Taylor
Oeceoclades perrieri (Schltr.) Garay & P.Taylor
Oeceoclades petiolata (Schltr.) Garay & P.Taylor
Oeceoclades peyrotii Bosser & Morat
Oeceoclades pulchra (Thouars) P.J.Cribb & M.A.Clem.
Oeceoclades quadriloba (Schltr.) Garay & P.Taylor
Oeceoclades rauhii (Senghas) Garay & P.Taylor
Oeceoclades saundersiana (Rchb.f.) Garay & P.Taylor
Oeceoclades sclerophylla (Rchb.f.) Garay & P.Taylor
†Oeceoclades seychellarum (Rolfe ex Summerh.) Garay & P.Taylor
Oeceoclades spathulifera (H.Perrier) Garay & P.Taylor
Oeceoclades ugandae (Rolfe) Garay & P.Taylor
Oeceoclades versicolor (Frapp. ex Cordem.) J.-B.Castillon
Oeceoclades zanzibarica (Summerh.) Garay & P.Taylor

See also 
 List of Orchidaceae genera

References 

 (1832) Edwards's Botanical Register 18: sub t. 1522. 
  2005. Handbuch der Orchideen-Namen. Dictionary of Orchid Names. Dizionario dei nomi delle orchidee. Ulmer, Stuttgart

External links 

 
Eulophiinae genera